Kenny Steppe (born 14 November 1988) is a Belgian professional footballer who plays as a goalkeeper for Belgian Pro League club Sint-Truidense.

Club career
As a child, Steppe played in the Germinal Beerschot youth ranks. However, after a few years, he came around to play for rivals Royal Antwerp FC, returning to Germinal in the 2006–07 season as a free agent.

He debuted on 3 February 2007 against Mons due to the injury of Luciano Da Silva.

The 2007–08 season proved to be his great breakthrough, becoming the first goalie after 6 matchdays. He also won the Belgian Goalkeeper of the Year award.

On the last weekend of the 2008 summer transfer window, he was sold to Heerenveen.

After years of injuries and competition, Steppe left Heerenveen on a free transfer and he signed with Waasland-Beveren to make a new start in his career.

Honours
SC Heerenveen
 KNVB Cup: 2008–09

Zulte Waregem
 Belgian Cup: 2016-17

References

External links
 
 Career stats - Voetbal International
 

1988 births
Living people
Footballers from Antwerp
Belgian footballers
Association football goalkeepers
Beerschot A.C. players
Royal Antwerp F.C. players
SC Heerenveen players
S.K. Beveren players
Sint-Truidense V.V. players
Belgian Pro League players
Eredivisie players
Belgian expatriate sportspeople in the Netherlands
Belgian expatriate footballers
Expatriate footballers in the Netherlands
Belgium under-21 international footballers